John Duncanson (ca. 1530–1601) was a Scottish minister, one of the Roman Catholic clergymen who willingly converted to the Protestant doctrines at the Reformation. He was reputed to have lived to be nearly 100 years old. He was as the President of St Leonard's College, St Andrews in 1556, around the time that he accepted the reformed faith. He held this position until 1566. He was the minister at Stirling in 1560.

He relinquished the charge about 1571.
He was the King's Minister, tutor and chaplain to King James VI from 1567 through 1580, and Moderator of the General Assembly of the Church of Scotland in 1574 and 1576.

In 1584, when he was upwards of eighty years of age, he was concerned in the so-called “ treasonable proceedings of the Earls of Angus and Mar, the Master of Glammis, with their colleagues and accomplices, and for reception, support, intercommuning, and defence of the said persons and their associates in the said treasonable act committed in the month of April last bypast". The treasonable act referred to was their seizing and holding the castle and town against the King (James VI.), whence they issued a proclamation declaring that their only object in seizing arms was to deliver the King from evil counsellors (Earl of Arran and others). The Earl is said to be Provost of Stirling at this time. John Duncanson must have been very active, because he was, along with others, excluded from the remission and pardon and protection granted by the King to the “ bailies, councillors, community, and inhabitants, with their wives and children".

On 26 October 1591 Duncanson was appointed to a commission to try, examine, and if required torture people suspected of witchcraft. The others appointees were Sir John Cockburn of Ormiston, David MacGill of Nesbit, Robert Bruce, William Litill, then Provost of Edinburgh, and John Arnot.

Biographical data
Duncanson as minister of the burgh had a manse assigned to him by the Town Council on 31 October 1560. He was appointed by the Assembly 27 June 1563, in conjunction with another, to plant kirks in Menteith. He was then appointed minister of the King's House (or Dean of the Chapel Royal of Stirling). He demitted his parochial charge after 16 January 1571. He was subsequently presented to the Vicarage of the Chapel Royal on 17 March 1567. He later demitted the post before 25 January 1574, on appointment to the Sub-Deanery. He was elected Moderator of General Assembly on 7 August 1574, also Commissioner of Galloway, and appointed with others to draw up the Second Book of Discipline in 1576 and 1578. He died on 4 October 1601, aged about 100.

Publications
He wrote a Reply to Tyrie, the Jesuit's Refutation of Knox's Answer to a former work, which was appointed to be revised by the General Assembly March 1673.

Family
He married: 
(1) Janet Watson
(2) Margaret Kenzow, who survived him. He had issue – 
James, minister of Alloa, Clackmannanshire, who married Helen Livingston;
William, apprenticed to Harry Smith, cutter, Edinburgh, 31st Jan. 1593 ; 
Walter, apprenticed to Robert Middleton, tailor, Edinburgh, 4 March 1594-5 ; 
Marion (married Alexander Hume, minister of Logie).

Bibliography
Calderwood's Hist., iii. 187, 330, 344 passim, iv. 191 passim
Records of Royal Burgh of Stirling, 1519–1666, 75, 76
Reg. of Deeds, xxiii., 232
Acts and Dec, lv., 49
Rogers's The Chapel Royal of Stirling, 56 et seq.

References

1530s births
1601 deaths
Year of birth uncertain
16th-century Scottish educators
16th-century Ministers of the Church of Scotland
Scottish chaplains
Christian chaplains
Converts to Calvinism from Roman Catholicism
Converts to Presbyterianism
Moderators of the General Assembly of the Church of Scotland
Scottish educators
Scottish Roman Catholic priests
Deans of the Chapel Royal in Scotland
Court of James VI and I
17th-century Scottish educators